Killingworth is a town in North Tyneside, England.

Killingworth may also refer to:

Places
Killingworth Village, a village in North Tyneside, England
Killingworth, New South Wales, Australia
Killingworth, Connecticut, United States

People with the surname
Boyd Killingworth (born 1992), Australian rugby union player
Grantham Killingworth (1699–1778), English Baptist controversialist

See also
Killingsworth (disambiguation)